The Sardeh Band Dam is located near Sardeh Band town, in the eastern part of Andar District of Ghazni Province of Afghanistan. It was constructed in 1967 (1346 in the Islamic calendar) by the Soviet Union and Afghanistan during the reign of Mohammed Zahir Shah prior to the Soviet–Afghan War. The dam provided irrigation water for more than 67,000 jeribs of land after completion. Currently only 2,000 jeribs of land is under cultivation. Maximum capacity of the reservoir is 259 million cubic meters of water, and the reservoir holds about 164 million gallons at present.

The dam system contains an earth dam, intake, spillway, one main canal (which is divides into two branches (the 21.5-kilometer Right Canal with 6 sub-canals and the 30-kilometres Left Canal with 16 sub-canals) and administration buildings.

The Sardeh Dam Reservoir is fed by the Jilga River which flows north–south from Paktika Province and Paktiya Province.  The river is also labeled as the Gardez River north of the dam and the Sardeh River south of the dam (by the National Atlas of the Democratic Republic of Afghanistan, page 13-14).

Context
The dam is an indication of the presence of aid from the USSR in Afghanistan prior to the invasion and subsequent occupation from 1979 to 1989. According to C.J. Chivers of the New York Times: "Moscow built schools, roads, airports and dams, and sponsored ministries, too. Soviet officials recruited students and bureaucrats for all manner of training, and invited the country’s elite and its officer-, civil-service and intellectual classes to long periods of study in the Soviet Union. Education, development and modernization—like this dam, which still influences both flood control and irrigation downstream—played no small part in the Kremlin’s Afghan policy, which ultimately failed."

The Band E Sardeh Dam was built during the same period as the High Dam in Aswan, Egypt, indicating a larger Soviet strategy for the development of third world nations it sought to bring under its sphere of influence. Large lettered Russian writing is still present on the down-stream face of the dam (visible from over 500 meters away) commemorating its completion in Russian and Pashto script. On the left it reads: "сарде 1967" and on the right: دسرده بند۱۳۴۶

Rehabilitation
According to USAID's Ghazni Infrastructure Needs Assessment: September 14–18, 2003 The Deputy Governor and other provincial officials agreed that the top priority for irrigation infrastructure rehabilitation in Ghazni province is the Sardeh Band Dam. The Director of the dam, as well as the local farmers, is extremely disappointed in the progress of the donor community on the dam. The Director reported that 14 NGOs, both national and international, have been asked to conduct assessments on the dam and surveys for funding the rehabilitation of the dam. Of these 14 NGOs, only four have conducted the assessments, and none have received funding for work to date. The NGOs who have conducted assessments on the dam are: International Engineering Consultancy Company, ACLU, LERCC and ARA (local NGO).

On 2 February 2010 members of Ghazni Provincial Reconstruction Team and Central Asia Development Group met with key leaders from Andar district to enlist support for a massive irrigation project concerning the repair of the irrigation canals fed by the Band E Sardeh Dam. "The Chardewal irrigation system was built to distribute water from the Bandee Sardi Dam throughout much of Andar, but due to neglect the canals have fallen into disrepair. Currently, water flows at only 50 percent capacity, limiting the ability of local farmers of the Kahnjoor farming zone to make a living. The reconstructed canal would be a one-kilometer cobblestone irrigation channel along the village with a curb separating the roadway from the canal. Chardewal, a village located in the middle of Andar, has suffered from drought and poor water management. With mentoring from the PRT, cooperation from the district sub-governor and village elders, the CADG will rebuild the village canal. It is the first stage of a long term cash-for-work program aimed at restoring the irrigation system and rehabilitating the Kahnjoor farming zone. Capacity building in this unstable district is considered the most critical mission for the development, reconstruction and stabilization efforts being made in Andar. 'Our problems are our water (supply) and our roads,' said Niaz Mohammad, an elder from Chardewal. 'We do not have enough water, wells or roads.' The project hopes to provide cash-for-work for deprived households in a Pashtun dominated area. The project could improve the agricultural potential for more than 2,000 people."

During the 7 August 2011 plenary session of the Meshrano Jirga (MJ) Senators invited the Emergency Response Committee to hear about their preparations for emergencies.  When discussing current drought conditions, Alhaj Allah Dad (Ghazni Senator)said: "The Bandi Sardi dam is full of mud. If cleared, it could irrigate thousands of acres of agricultural land."

Military activity
The Band E Sardeh Dam was the home of a Soviet garrison during their occupation of Afghanistan during the 1980s and currently garrisons an Afghan National Army Battalion. Nearby the Band E Sardeh Dam is the abandoned Sardeh Band Airport which was used during the Soviet occupation but now no longer exists.  The wrecked hulls of Soviet tanks, armored personnel carriers, and other heavy equipment are still present as of 2012.   Both the Afghan and U.S. militaries at Bande Sardeh have used the base as a gathering place for locals and elders to discuss local security and military developments.

On 12 June 2002 a Lockheed MC-130H Hercules was participating in a night exfiltration mission to remove U.S. Army Special Forces troops from the area when it tried to take off from an improved airstrip at Sardeh Band. The plane impacted the ground and crashed in a barren area, 2.5 nautical miles from the airstrip.

Soviet expeditionary dam construction
The Soviet Union built many other dams in other countries as it sought to extend its sphere of influence.  Many of these projects were undertaken by a Russian firm called Hydroproject (Russian: Институт «Гидропроект», Gidroproekt).  It is unclear if Hydroproject was involved in the design or construction of Band E Sardeh Dam.  Other expeditionary projects undertaken by Hydroproject include:
 Aswan High Dam in Egypt
 Jenpeg Dam, the first stage of Nelson River Hydroelectric Project in Manitoba, Canada
 Paraná Medio, Argentina (proposed)
 Sanmenxia Dam, China
 Malka Vakana Dam, Ethiopia
 Tehri dam, India
 Dukan Dam, Iraq
 Đerdap dams on the Danube, Romania-Serbia
 Baath Dam, Syria
 Tabqa Dam (a.k.a. Euphrates Dam), Syria
 Tishrin Dam, Syria
 Yali Falls Dam, Vietnam
 Hòa Bình Dam, Vietnam
 Sơn La Dam, Vietnam
 Limón Dam, Peru

See also
 Darunta Dam
 List of dams and reservoirs in Afghanistan
 Water supply in Afghanistan

References

External links
 Astronaut photography of the Bande E Sardeh Reservoir and surrounding areas
 The New York Times: Reporter’s Notebook: In Afghanistan, Glimpses of the Soviet Try
 Band E Sardeh Dam in Google Maps
 Ghazni PRT Members Meet with Afghans to Discuss Irrigation Project 

Dams in Afghanistan
Buildings and structures in Ghazni Province
Rock-filled dams
Water supply and sanitation in Afghanistan
Dams completed in 1967
1967 establishments in Afghanistan
Military installations of Afghanistan
Military installations of the United States in Afghanistan
Afghanistan–Soviet Union relations
Soviet foreign aid